Eois polycyma is a moth in the family Geometridae. It is found on the Philippines.

References

Moths described in 1930
Eois
Moths of Asia